Mas de Barberans is a municipality in the comarca of Montsià in Catalonia, Spain. It is part of the Taula del Sénia free association of municipalities.

Local crafts
This town is located at the feet of the eastern edge of the Ports de Tortosa-Beseit. The inhabitants have traditionally specialized in weaving and making basketry articles with the leaves of the Mediterranean Fan Palm, locally known as paumes. These leaves were gathered in the Ports mountainsides during the summer. This trade died down in the 1970s.

See also
Ports de Tortosa-Beseit

References

External links

 Web de l'Ajuntament
 Government data pages 

Municipalities in Montsià